S. aethiopica, referring to Ethiopia, may refer to:

 Scutigera aethiopica, a centipede in the family Scutigeridae 
 Sphodromantis aethiopica, a mantis in the family Mantidae
 Stachys aethiopica, a plant in the family Lamiaceae
 Stathmodera aethiopica, a beetle in the family Cerambycidae
 Stenalia aethiopica, a beetle in the family Mordellidae
 Stenoptilia aethiopica, a moth in the family Pterophoridae

See also
Aethiopica